Horezu may refer to the following places in Romania:

 Horezu, a town in Vâlcea County
 Horezu, a village in the commune Turcinești, Gorj County
 Horezu, a village in the commune Dobrețu, Olt County
 Horezu (Bistricioara), tributary of the Bistricioara in Vâlcea County
 Horezu (Geamărtălui), tributary of the Geamărtălui in Vâlcea, Dolj and Olt Counties